Decatur County is a county located in the U.S. state of Tennessee. As of the 2020 census, the population was 11,435. Its county seat is Decaturville.

History

This county is named after naval hero Stephen Decatur, Jr., who gained national recognition in the First Barbary War, the Second Barbary War, and the War of 1812 by his leadership and achievements at sea.  The county was created in November 1845 from the part of Perry County west of the Tennessee River in response to a petition by citizens on the west side of the river who lacked easy access to the county seat on the east side.

In 2015, the Decatur County clerk of court and the entire staff of that office resigned, to express conscientious objection to the United States Supreme Court's ruling in Obergefell v. Hodges, which would oblige the office to issue marriage licenses to same-sex couples.

Geography

Adjacent counties
Benton County (north)
Perry County (east)
Wayne County (southeast)
Hardin County (south)
Henderson County (west)
Carroll County (northwest)

National protected area
Tennessee National Wildlife Refuge (part)

State protected area
Carroll Cabin Barrens State Natural Area
Cypress Pond Refuge

Demographics

2020 census

As of the 2020 United States census, there were 11,435 people, 4,440 households, and 3,059 families residing in the county.

2000 census
As of the census of 2000, there were 11,731 people, 4,908 households, and 3,415 families residing in the county.  The population density was 35 people per square mile (14/km2).

There were 6,448 housing units at an average density of 19 per square mile (7/km2).  The racial makeup of the county was 94.12% White, 3.47% Black or African American, 0.23% Native American, 0.20% Asian, 0.03% Pacific Islander, 1.20% from other races, and 0.76% from two or more races.  1.95% of the population were Hispanic or Latino of any race.

There were 4,908 households, out of which 27.30% had children under the age of 18 living with them, 56.70% were married couples living together, 9.00% had a female householder with no husband present, and 30.40% were non-families. 27.60% of all households were made up of individuals, and 13.40% had someone living alone who was 65 years of age or older.  The average household size was 2.34 and the average family size was 2.82.

In the county, the population was spread out, with 21.70% under the age of 18, 7.90% from 18 to 24, 25.90% from 25 to 44, 26.30% from 45 to 64, and 18.20% who were 65 years of age or older.  The median age was 41 years. For every 100 females there were 94.50 males.  For every 100 females age 18 and over, there were 91.90 males.

The median income for a household in the county was $28,741, and the median income for a family was $34,919. Males had a median income of $25,945 versus $20,155 for females. The per capita income for the county was $17,285.  About 13.80% of families and 16.00% of the population were below the poverty line, including 18.90% of those under age 18 and 22.20% of those age 65 or over.

Communities

City
Parsons

Towns
Decaturville (county seat)
Scotts Hill (partial)

Unincorporated communities
Bath Springs
Bible Hill
 Dunbar
Holladay (partial)
 Hopewell
Lick Skillet
Perryville
Sugar Tree

Politics
Decatur County – like all of rural Tennessee – is a Republican stronghold. The last Democrat to carry this county was Al Gore in 2000, and even before the collapse of traditional rural Democratic support after Bill Clinton the county had a sizeable Unionist population that caused it to vote Republican several times during the “System of 1896”.

See also
National Register of Historic Places listings in Decatur County, Tennessee

References

External links

 Official site
 Decatur County Chamber of Commerce
 Decatur County Schools
 Decatur County, TNGenWeb – genealogy resources 

 
1845 establishments in Tennessee
Populated places established in 1845
West Tennessee